The Birmingham Business Journal is a weekly business newspaper published in Birmingham, Alabama, United States. The newspaper was founded in 1983 by Michael C. Randle and Tina Verciglio-Savas and became a part of American City Business Journals in 1999. The newspaper publishes business news in the Birmingham area and also the state of Alabama. The Birmingham Business Journal is a part of American City Business Journals owned by Advance Publications, which also publishes The Birmingham News.

Birmingham Business Journal's Annual Awards
The Birmingham Business Journal gives several yearly awards.
 Top 40 Under 40 This award is given yearly to 40 up and coming men and women in the Birmingham business community who are under the age 40. The award has been given every year since the Birmingham Business Journal was started.
 Top Birmingham Women This award is given yearly to ten Birmingham businesswomen. The award has been given every year since 1988.
 Fast Track 25 This award is given yearly to the 25 fastest growing companies in the Birmingham area. Rankings are chosen based on a number of different criteria.
 Best in Business This award is given yearly to Birmingham business. Categories for the winning companies include largest companies grouped by employee size, Best Nonprofit, Best Rising Star, and Best Executive of the Year.

Awards

2018 Better Newspaper Contest - Alabama Press Association

References

External links
Birmingham Business Journal website

Newspapers published in Alabama
Mass media in Birmingham, Alabama
Business newspapers published in the United States
Advance Publications
Publications established in 1983
1983 establishments in Alabama